Torres del Paine are impressive mountains peaks located in the Magallanes and Antártica Chilena Region. The peaks give the names for:

 Torres del Paine, Chile, the Chilean commune of the region
 Cordillera del Paine, the mountain range that contains the peaks
 Torres del Paine National Park, where the range is located